TDG may refer to:

Chemistry
 Transient directing group in organic chemistry
Companies
 TDG Limited, a UK logistics and distribution company
 Traffic Design Group, a New Zealand consultancy
 TransDigm Group, NYSE ticker symbol

Biology
 Thymine-DNA glycosylase, an enzyme